Fussy is a commune in the Cher department in the Centre-Val de Loire region of France.

Geography
The village is in an agricultural area, with a little light industry. It is around 8 km north of the centre of Bourges at the junction of the D940 and D11 roads.

Population

Sights
 The church of St. Hilaire, dating from the nineteenth century.
 The World War II museum, opened in 1994.

International relations
Fussy is twinned with:
 Corminboeuf, Switzerland since May, 1991.

See also
Communes of the Cher department

References

External links

Official website of Fussy 

Communes of Cher (department)